Peter Atkinson (1735–1805)  was an English architect.

Biography
He was born at or near Ripon and started work as a carpenter. He later became an assistant to John Carr and was employed at Buxton, Harewood and elsewhere. In 1786 he became responsible for maintaining York's corporation property, and subsequently took over Carr's extensive works in Yorkshire and further north.

The Atkinson family of York architects continued after Atkinson's death. His son, Peter, himself had sons John Bownas Atkinson (1807–1874) and William Atkinson (architect, born 1811).

Before their father's death, the two sons had taken over and for the next thirty plus years they were the most prolific of the city's architects. In 1877 William took James Demaisne (1842–1911) as partner.

Works
Among Atkinson's works were:
 No. 18 Blake Street, York, c. 1789
 Monk Bridge, York, 1794 (later widened in 1924–26)
 Hackness Hall, 1797, a large mansion for Sir R.V.B. Johnstone at Hackness (near Scarborough). In 1910 the building was gutted by fire, but was subsequently restored by Walter Brierley
 Hainton Hall, Lincolnshire, rebuilt the west front for George Heneage in 1800
 A stable block at Wortley Hall, West Riding of Yorkshire, for Earl of Wharncliffe c.1800
 Enlargement of the Female Prison in York Castle by adding the end bays to match John Carr's Assize Courts, 1802 (the Female Prison is now part of York Castle Museum)
 Additions at Ormsby Hall, South Ormsby, Lincolnshire, for Charles Burrell Massingberd, 1803
 York, No. 51 Bootham, for Sir R. V. B. Johnstone, now a school, 1803
 Gateway and farm buildings at Harewood House, West Riding, for the 1st Earl of Harewood, c. 1803
 Brockfield Hall, Warthill, North Riding of Yorkshire, for Benjamin Agar, 1804–7

References

People from Ripon
1735 births
1805 deaths
18th-century English architects
19th-century English architects
English carpenters
Architects from Yorkshire